Charles Adolphus Row (1816–1896) was an English Church of 
England clergyman and moral philosopher.

Life

Charles Adolphus Row was born in 1816.
He was the third son of William Row of St John, Cornwall. He attended Pembroke College, Oxford where he matriculated on 7 May 1834 at the age of 17. He was a scholar at Pembroke from 1834–38.
He obtained a B.A. on 29 November 1838 and an M.A. on 11 November 1841.

From 1848–61 Row was headmaster of Royal Free Grammar School, Mansfield.

In 1870 the Evangelical Magazine and Missionary Chronicle noted that Row was delivering a course of lectures in defence of the gospel at Cleveland Hall, Fitzroy square, London, the former secularist center. In May 1874 he was appointed to the Prebend of Harleston in St Paul's Cathedral.

Row delivered the Bampton Lectures at the University of Oxford in 1877. He took as his theme "Christian Evidences Viewed in Relation to Modern Thought." In his lectures he looked for a compromise between theologians who believed in the complete infallibility of the Bible and scientists who pointed out problems with a literal interpretation. He proposed an innovative solution, which he knew might seem daring to some of his audience since it allowed that the Bible might include errors of fact:

Charles Adolphus Row died in 1896.

Bibliography
Row was a prolific author. A sampling of his work:

References
Citations

Sources

1816 births
1896 deaths
English Anglicans
Writers from Cornwall
Alumni of Pembroke College, Oxford
Academics of the University of Oxford